The 1984–85 Los Angeles Lakers season was the 39th season of the franchise, 37th in the National Basketball Association (NBA) and 25th in Los Angeles. The Lakers entered the season as runner-ups of the 1984 NBA Finals, where they lost in heartbreaking fashion to the Boston Celtics in seven games, increasing their losing streak to the Celtics in the NBA Finals to 8 consecutive losses.

In the playoffs, the Lakers swept in the Phoenix Suns in three games in the First Round, then defeated the Portland Trail Blazers in five games in the Semifinals, before defeating the Denver Nuggets in five games in the Conference Finals to advance to the NBA Finals for the fifth time in the 1980s, facing off against the defending NBA champion Boston Celtics in a rematch of last season's NBA Finals. This time, however, the Lakers were able to return to their championship ways and win their ninth NBA championship (their fourth in Los Angeles), avenging their NBA Finals loss and getting revenge on the Celtics, defeating them in six games, and marking the first time the Lakers had defeated the Celtics in the NBA Finals. The Lakers also became the first team to have defeated the Celtics in the NBA Finals while on the road, a feat that has since only been accomplished by the 2022 Golden State Warriors.

NBA Draft

Transactions
The Lakers have been involved in the following transactions during the 1984–1985 season.

Free Agent Additions

Roster

Regular season

Season standings

Record vs. opponents

Game log

Regular season

|- align="center" bgcolor="#ffcccc"
| 1
| October 27, 19845:30p.m. PDT
| @ San Antonio
| L 112–113
| Johnson (32)
| McAdoo, Worthy (8)
| Johnson (8)
| HemisFair Arena13,506
| 0–1
|- align="center" bgcolor="#ffcccc"
| 2
| October 28, 19845:00p.m. PST
| @ Dallas
| L 96–107
| Abdul-Jabbar (20)
| Abdul-Jabbar (9)
| Abdul-Jabbar (6)
| Reunion Arena17,007
| 0–2
|- align="center" bgcolor="#ccffcc"
| 3 || October 30, 19847:30PM PST || Golden State || W 144-110 || McGee,Scott (26) || Johnson (12) || Johnson (10) || The Forum11,545 || 1-2

|- align="center" bgcolor="#ffcccc"
| 4 || November 1, 19847:30PM PST || @ Seattle || L 103-105 || Abdul-Jabbar (24) || Johnson (10) || Johnson (14) || Kingdome7,020 || 1-3
|- align="center" bgcolor="#ccffcc"
| 5
| November 2, 19847:30p.m. PST
| San Antonio
| W 119–100
| McGee (21)
| Abdul-Jabbar (8)
| Johnson (11)
| The Forum13,550
| 2–3
|- align="center" bgcolor="#ccffcc"
| 6
| November 4, 19847:30p.m. PST
| Portland
| W 124–116
| Abdul-Jabbar (25)
| Worthy (14)
| Johnson (11)
| The Forum14,148
| 3–3
|- align="center" bgcolor="#ffcccc"
| 7
| November 6, 19847:30p.m. PST
| Denver
| L 130–146
| Johnson (19)
| McGee (8)
| Johnson (8)
| The Forum11,272
| 3–4
|- align="center" bgcolor="#ffcccc"
| 8 || November 8, 19847:30PM PST || @ Golden State || L 106-122 || Abdul-Jabbar,Johnson (20) || Johnson (9) || Johnson (12) || Oakland-Alameda County Coliseum10,523 || 3-5
|- align="center" bgcolor="#ccffcc"
| 9
| November 9, 19847:30p.m. PST
| @ Portland
| W 130–126
| Scott (27)
| Abdul-Jabbar, Worthy (7)
| Johnson (15)
| Memorial Coliseum12,666
| 4–5
|- align="center" bgcolor="#ccffcc"
| 10
| November 11, 19847:30p.m. PST
| New Jersey
| W 121–111
| Worthy (22)
| Worthy (9)
| Johnson (12)
| The Forum13,257
| 5–5
|- align="center" bgcolor="#ccffcc"
| 11
|- align="center" bgcolor="#ccffcc"
| 12
| November 18, 19847:30p.m. PST
| Milwaukee
| W 96–89
| Worthy (24)
| Cooper (8)
| Johnson (11)
| The Forum12,768
| 7–5
|- align="center" bgcolor="#ccffcc"
| 13
| November 20, 19847:30p.m. PST
| Phoenix
| W 130–108
| Johnson (29)
| Worthy (9)
| Johnson, Scott (10)
| The Forum13,792
| 8–5
|- align="center" bgcolor="#ccffcc"
| 14
| November 21, 19846:30p.m. PST
| @ Phoenix
| W 102–97
| Scott (21)
| Worthy (12)
| Johnson (8)
| Arizona Veterans Memorial Coliseum12,671
| 9–5
|- align="center" bgcolor="#ccffcc"
| 15
|- align="center" bgcolor="#ffcccc"
| 16 || November 25, 19847:30PM PST || Seattle || L 94-105 || Abdul-Jabbar (23) || Kareem Abdul-Jabbar (14) || Cooper (7) || The Forum12,270 || 10-6
|- align="center" bgcolor="#ccffcc"
| 17
| November 28, 19846:30p.m. PST
| @ Utah
| W 114–109
| Abdul-Jabbar (24)
| Worhty (17)
| Johnson (14)
| Salt Palace Acord Arena11,331
| 11–6
|- align="center" bgcolor="#ccffcc"
| 18

|- align="center" bgcolor="#ffcccc"
| 19
| December 2, 19847:30p.m. PST
| Chicago
| L 112–113
| Abdul-Jabbar (32)
| Johnson, Rambis (7)
| Johnson (16)
| The Forum15,505
| 12–7
|- align="center" bgcolor="#ccffcc"
| 20
| December 4, 19844:30p.m. PST
| @ Cleveland
| W 116–112
| Abdul-Jabbar (31)
| Abdul-Jabbar (13)
| Johnson (14)
| Richfield Coliseum11,298
| 13–7
|- align="center" bgcolor="#ccffcc"
| 21
| December 5, 19844:30p.m. PST
| @ New Jersey
| W 104–93
| Abdul-Jabbar (20)
| Abdul-Jabbar, Johnson (6)
| Johnson (9)
| Brendan Byrne Arena14,532
| 14–7
|- align="center" bgcolor="#ffcccc"
| 22
| December 7, 19845:00p.m. PST
| @ Philadelphia
| L 116–122
| Abdul-Jabbar (24)
| Worthy (10)
| Johnson (17)
| The Spectrum17,921
| 14–8
|- align="center" bgcolor="#ffcccc"
| 23
| December 8, 19844:30p.m. PST
| @ Washington
| L 98–101
| Johnson (23)
| Abdul-Jabbar, Worthy (9)
| Johnson (12)
| Capital Centre19,105
| 14–9
|- align="center" bgcolor="#ccffcc"
| 24 || December 12, 19847:30PM PST || Golden State || W 131-107 || McGee (17) || Rambis (13) || Johnson (10) || The Forum12,476 || 15-9
|- align="center" bgcolor="#ffcccc"
| 25 || December 13, 19847:30PM PST || @ Seattle || L 122-124 (OT) || Abdul-Jabbar (34) || Worthy (16) || Johnson (15) || Kingdome8,491 || 15-10
|- align="center" bgcolor="#ccffcc"
| 26
| December 16, 19847:30p.m. PST
| Washington
| W 109–101
| Worthy (26)
| Worthy (11)
| Johnson (18)
| The Forum15,070
| 16–10
|- align="center" bgcolor="#ccffcc"
| 27
| December 18, 19844:30p.m. PST
| @ Atlanta
| W 117–116
| Johnson (25)
| Johnson (14)
| Johnson (20)
| The Omni9,844
| 17–10
|- align="center" bgcolor="#ccffcc"
| 28
| December 19, 19845:00p.m. PST
| @ Houston
| W 123–116
| Abdul-Jabbar (32)
| Rambis (8)
| Johnson (20)
| The Summit16,016
| 18–10
|- align="center" bgcolor="#ccffcc"
| 29
| December 21, 19847:30p.m. PST
| Phoenix
| W 119–105
| Worthy (30)
| Worthy (14)
| Johnson (12)
| The Forum14,764
| 19–10
|- align="center" bgcolor="#ccffcc"
| 30 || December 26, 19847:30PM PST || Seattle || W 101-97 || Abdul-Jabbar (24) || Abdul-Jabbar (9) || Johnson (10) || The Forum15,582 || 20-10
|- align="center" bgcolor="#ccffcc"
| 31
| December 28, 19846:30p.m. PST
| @ Denver
| W 135–123
| Abdul-Jabbar (33)
| Johnson (11)
| Johnson (14)
| McNichols Sports Arena17,022
| 21–10
|- align="center" bgcolor="#ccffcc"
| 32

|- align="center" bgcolor="#ccffcc"
| 33
| January 4, 19857:30p.m. PST
| Portland
| W 120–95
| Abdul-Jabbar (28)
| Abdul-Jabbar (11)
| Cooper (7)
| The Forum14,979
| 23–10
|- align="center" bgcolor="#ccffcc"
| 34
| January 6, 19857:30p.m. PST
| San Antonio
| W 99–98
| Abdul-Jabbar (28)
| Abdul-Jabbar (11)
| Cooper (14)
| The Forum13,513
| 24–10
|- align="center" bgcolor="#ffcccc"
| 35
| January 8, 19857:30p.m. PST
| Denver
| L 124–126
| Abdul-Jabbar (35)
| Abdul-Jabbar (12)
| Cooper (16)
| The Forum13,024
| 24–11
|- align="center" bgcolor="#ccffcc"
| 36
| January 10, 19857:30p.m. PST
| Utah
| W 120–112
| Johnson (20)
| Rambis (11)
| Johnson (10)
| The Forum14,547
| 25–11
|- align="center" bgcolor="#ccffcc"
| 37
| January 11, 19855:30p.m. PST
| @ Dallas
| W 121–102
| Abdul-Jabbar (30)
| Abdul-Jabbar (11)
| Scott (6)
| Reunion Arena17,007
| 26–11
|- align="center" bgcolor="#ffcccc"
| 38
| January 13, 19859:00a.m. PST
| @ Detroit
| L 98–121
| Johnson, McGee (22)
| Abdul-Jabbar (13)
| Johnson (10)
| Pontiac Silverdome23,475
| 26–12
|- align="center" bgcolor="#ffcccc"
| 39
| January 15, 19855:30p.m. PST
| @ Milwaukee
| L 105–115
| Johnson (32)
| Worthy (11)
| Johnson (9)
| MECCA Arena11,052
| 26–13
|- align="center" bgcolor="#ffcccc"
| 40
| January 16, 19855:00p.m. PST
| @ Boston
| L 102–104
| Abdul-Jabbar (33)
| Abdul-Jabbar, Johnson, Rambis (7)
| Johnson (13)
| Boston Garden14,890
| 26–14
|- align="center" bgcolor="#ccffcc"
| 41
| January 18, 19857:30p.m. PST
| Dallas
| W 110–92
| Worthy (19)
| Rambis (7)
| Johnson (18)
| The Forum17,505
| 27–14
|- align="center" bgcolor="#ccffcc"
| 42 || January 19, 19858:00PM PST || @ Golden State || W 139-109 || Abdul-Jabbar (22) || Worthy (7) || Johnson (13) || Oakland-Alameda County Coliseum13,295 || 28-14
|- align="center" bgcolor="#ccffcc"
| 43
|- align="center" bgcolor="#ccffcc"
| 44
| January 25, 19858:30p.m. PST
| Philadelphia
| W 109–104
| Abdul-Jabbar (23)
| Abdul-Jabbar (9)
| Johnson (15)
| The Forum17,505
| 30–14
|- align="center" bgcolor="#ffcccc"
| 45
| January 26, 19856:30p.m. PST
| @ Utah
| L 83–96
| Abdul-Jabbar, Johnson (19)
| Johnson (8)
| Johnson (6)
| Salt Palace Acord Arena12,675
| 30–15
|- align="center" bgcolor="#ccffcc"
| 46
| January 29, 19857:30p.m. PST
| @ Portland
| W 122–106
| Abdul-Jabbar (29)
| Abdul-Jabbar (13)
| Johnson (13)
| Memorial Coliseum12,666
| 31–15
|- align="center" bgcolor="#ffcccc"
| 47
| January 30, 19857:30p.m. PST
| Houston
| L 113–116
| Abdul-Jabbar (34)
| Abdul-Jabbar (9)
| Johnson (10)
| The Forum17,505
| 31–16

|- align="center" bgcolor="#ccffcc"
| 48
|- align="center" bgcolor="#ccffcc"
| 49
|- align="center" bgcolor="#ccffcc"
| 50
|- align="center" bgcolor="#ccffcc"
| 51
| February 5, 19855:00p.m. CST
| @ Houston
| W 113–104
| Abdul-Jabbar (40)
| Worthy (10)
| Johnson (19)
| The Summit16,016
| 35–16
|- align="center"
|colspan="9" bgcolor="#bbcaff"|All-Star Break
|- style="background:#cfc;"
|- bgcolor="#bbffbb"
|- align="center" bgcolor="#ccffcc"
| 52
|- align="center" bgcolor="#ccffcc"
| 53
| February 15, 19857:30p.m. PST
| Atlanta
| L 111–120
| Johnson (23)
| Rambis (10)
| Johnson (16)
| The Forum13,852
| 37–16
|- align="center" bgcolor="#ccffcc"
| 54
| February 17, 198512:30p.m. PST
| Boston
| W 117–111
| Johnson (37)
| Rambis (12)
| Johnson (13)
| The Forum17,505
| 38–16
|- align="center" bgcolor="#ccffcc"
| 55
| February 19, 19855:30p.m. PST
| @ Chicago
| W 127–117
| Abdul-Jabbar (27)
| Abdul-Jabbar (9)
| Johnson (12)
| Chicago Stadium19,052
| 39–16
|- align="center" bgcolor="#ccffcc"
| 56
|- align="center" bgcolor="#ffcccc"
| 57
|- align="center" bgcolor="#ccffcc"
| 58
|- align="center" bgcolor="#ccffcc"
| 59
| February 26, 19857:30p.m. PST
| Houston
| W 100–94
| Abdul-Jabbar, Worthy (19)
| Johnson (11)
| Johnson (18)
| The Forum17,505
| 42–17
|- align="center" bgcolor="#ffcccc"
| 60
| February 28, 19856:30p.m. PST
| @ Phoenix
| L 105–117
| Worthy (22)
| Worthy (8)
| Cooper (9)
| Arizona Veterans Memorial Coliseum14,660
| 42–18

|- align="center" bgcolor="#ccffcc"
| 61
| March 2, 19855:30p.m. PST
| @ Dallas
| W 125–106
| Abdul-Jabbar (25)
| Abdul-Jabbar (12)
| Johnson (16)
| Reunion Arena17,007
| 43–18
|- align="center" bgcolor="#ccffcc"
| 62 || March 6, 19857:30PM PST || Golden State || W 145-119 || McGee (29) || Kupchak,McGee (7) || Lester (10) || The Forum15,371 || 44-18
|- align="center" bgcolor="#ccffcc"
| 63
| March 9, 19858:00p.m. PST
| Cleveland
| W 133–106
| Scott (26)
| Rambis (10)
| Johnson (13)
| The Forum17,505
| 45–18
|- align="center" bgcolor="#ccffcc"
| 64
| March 12, 19857:30p.m. PST
| Utah
| W 123–108
| Johnson, McAdoo, Scott (18)
| Rambis (13)
| Johnson (13)
| The Forum17,505
| 46–18
|- align="center" bgcolor="#ccffcc"
| 65
| March 13, 19856:30p.m. PST
| @ Utah
| W 120–105
| Abdul-Jabbar (27)
| Abdul-Jabbar (10)
| Johnson (11)
| Salt Palace Acord Arena10,158
| 47–18
|- align="center" bgcolor="#ccffcc"
| 66
| March 15, 19857:30p.m. PST
| San Antonio
| W 115–114
| Worthy (25)
| McAdoo, Worthy (7)
| Johnson (18)
| The Forum16,130
| 48–18
|- align="center" bgcolor="#ccffcc"
| 67
|- align="center" bgcolor="#ccffcc"
| 68
| March 19, 19856:30p.m. PST
| @ Phoenix
| W 130–112
| Abdul-Jabbar (26)
| Abdul-Jabbar (8)
| Johnson (10)
| Arizona Veterans Memorial Coliseum13,473
| 50–18
|- align="center" bgcolor="#ccffcc"
| 69
| March 22, 19855:30p.m. PST
| @ Houston
| W 130–107
| Abdul-Jabbar (30)
| Abdul-Jabbar, Johnson (8)
| Johnson (16)
| The Summit16,018
| 51–18
|- align="center" bgcolor="#ccffcc"
| 70
| March 24, 19857:30p.m. PST
| Detroit
| W 148–130
| Abdul-Jabbar (30)
| Rambis (11)
| Johnson (19)
| The Forum17,505
| 52–18
|- align="center" bgcolor="#ffcccc"
| 71
| March 26, 19857:30p.m. PST
| @ Portland
| L 113–116 (OT)
| Scott (28)
| Rambis (13)
| Johnson (14)
| Memorial Coliseum12,666
| 52–19
|- align="center" bgcolor="#ccffcc"
| 72 || March 27, 19857:30PM PST || @ Seattle || W 122-97 || Abdul-Jabbar,Scott (21) || Kupchak (13) || Johnson (10) || Kingdome10,542 || 53-19
|- align="center" bgcolor="#ccffcc"
| 73
| March 29, 19857:30p.m. PST
| Dallas
| W 120–115
| Johnson (23)
| Abdul-Jabbar (8)
| Johnson (13)
| The Forum17,505
| 54–19
|- align="center" bgcolor="#ccffcc"
| 74
| March 31, 19857:00p.m. PST
| Phoenix
| W 123–98
| Abdul-Jabbar, Scott (20)
| Spriggs (9)
| Johnson (14)
| The Forum15,922
| 55–19

|- align="center" bgcolor="#ccffcc"
| 75
| April 2, 19856:30p.m. PST
| @ Denver
| W 118–104
| Abdul-Jabbar, McAdoo (20)
| Abdul-Jabbar (13)
| Johnson (13)
| McNichols Sports Arena17,022
| 56–19
|- align="center" bgcolor="#ffcccc"
| 76
| April 3, 19855:30p.m. PST
| @ San Antonio
| L 108–122
| Worthy (32)
| Rambis (16)
| Johnson (13)
| HemisFair Arena11,627
| 56–20
|- align="center" bgcolor="#ccffcc"
| 77
|- align="center" bgcolor="#ccffcc"
| 78
| April 7, 198512:30p.m. PST
| Portland
| W 135–133 (OT)
| Johnson (39)
| Rambis (15)
| Johnson (11)
| The Forum13,186
| 58–20
|- align="center" bgcolor="#ccffcc"
| 79
| April 9, 19857:30p.m. PST
| Denver
| W 148–119
| McGee (26)
| Johnson (8)
| Johnson (11)
| The Forum17,505
| 59–20
|- align="center" bgcolor="#ccffcc"
| 80 || April 11, 19857:30PM PST || @ Golden State || W 137-130 || Johnson (28) || Rambis (15) || Johnson (17) || Oakland-Alameda County Coliseum10,400 || 60-20
|- align="center" bgcolor="#ccffcc"
| 81 || April 12, 19857:30PM PST || Seattle || W 145-131 || McGee (41) || Kupchak (13) || Lester (12) || The Forum15,434 || 61-20
|- align="center" bgcolor="#ccffcc"
| 82

Playoffs

|- align="center" bgcolor="#ccffcc"
| 1
| April 18, 19857:30p.m. PST
| Phoenix
| W 142–114
| McGee (22)
| Cooper, McAdoo (6)
| Johnson (19)
| The Forum15,547
| 1–0
|- align="center" bgcolor="#ccffcc"
| 2
| April 20, 198512:30p.m. PST
| Phoenix
| W 147–130
| Abdul-Jabbar (24)
| Rambis (7)
| Cooper, Johnson (12)
| The Forum15,261
| 2–0
|- align="center" bgcolor="#ccffcc"
| 3
| April 23, 19857:30p.m. PST
| @ Phoenix
| W 119–103
| Worthy (23)
| Rambis (9)
| Johnson (11)
| Arizona Veterans Memorial Coliseum8,741
| 3–0
|-

|- align="center" bgcolor="#ccffcc"
| 1
| April 27, 198512:30p.m. PST
| Portland
| W 125–101
| Scott (20)
| Rambis (14)
| Johnson (12)
| The Forum17,505
| 1–0
|- align="center" bgcolor="#ccffcc"
| 2
| April 30, 19857:30p.m. PDT
| Portland
| W 134–118
| Scott (31)
| Johnson (9)
| Johnson (18)
| The Forum17,505
| 2–0
|- align="center" bgcolor="#ccffcc"
| 3
| May 3, 19857:30p.m. PDT
| @ Portland
| W 130–126
| Worthy (28)
| Abdul-Jabbar, McAdoo (9)
| Johnson (23)
| Memorial Coliseum12,666
| 3–0
|- align="center" bgcolor="#ffcccc"
| 4
| May 5, 198512:30p.m. PDT
| @ Portland
| L 107–115
| Johnson (31)
| Abdul-Jabbar (17)
| Johnson (13)
| Memorial Coliseum12,666
| 3–1
|- align="center" bgcolor="#ccffcc"
| 5
| May 7, 19857:30p.m. PDT
| Portland
| W 139–120
| Johnson (34)
| Johnson (9)
| Johnson (19)
| The Forum17,505
| 4–1
|-

|- align="center" bgcolor="#ccffcc"
| 1
| May 11, 198512:30p.m. PDT
| Denver
| W 139–122
| Scott (27)
| Abdul-Jabbar, Cooper, Rambis (7)
| Johnson (16)
| The Forum16,109
| 1–0
|- align="center" bgcolor="#ffcccc"
| 2
| May 14, 19858:00p.m. PDT
| Denver
| L 114–136
| Scott (22)
| Johnson (9)
| Johnson (15)
| The Forum17,505
| 1–1
|- align="center" bgcolor="#ccffcc"
| 3
| May 17, 19857:00p.m. PDT
| @ Denver
| W 136–118
| Worthy (28)
| Johnson (14)
| Johnson (15)
| McNichols Sports Arena17,022
| 2–1
|- align="center" bgcolor="#ccffcc"
| 4
| May 19, 19853:00p.m. PDT
| @ Denver
| W 120–116
| Abdul-Jabbar (29)
| Worthy (13)
| Johnson (13)
| McNichols Sports Arena17,022
| 3–1
|- align="center" bgcolor="#ccffcc"
| 5
| May 22, 19858:30p.m. PDT
| Denver
| W 153–109
| Worthy (25)
| Kupchak (10)
| Johnson (19)
| The Forum17,505
| 4–1
|-

|- align="center" bgcolor="#ffcccc"
| 1
| May 27, 198512Noon PDT
| @ Boston
| L 114–148
| Worthy (20)
| Rambis (9)
| Johnson (12)
| Boston Garden14,890
| 0–1
|- align="center" bgcolor="#ccffcc"
| 2
| May 30, 19856:00p.m. PDT
| @ Boston
| W 109–102
| Abdul-Jabbar (30)
| Abdul-Jabbar (17)
| Johnson (13)
| Boston Garden14,890
| 1–1
|- align="center" bgcolor="#ccffcc"
| 3
| June 2, 198512:30p.m. PDT
| Boston
| W 136–111
| Worthy (29)
| Abdul-Jabbar (14)
| Johnson (16)
| The Forum17,505
| 2–1
|- align="center" bgcolor="#ffcccc"
| 4
| June 5, 19856:00p.m. PDT
| Boston
| L 105–107
| Abdul-Jabbar (21)
| Johnson (11)
| Johnson (12)
| The Forum17,505
| 2–2
|- align="center" bgcolor="#ccffcc"
| 5
| June 7, 19856:00p.m. PDT
| Boston
| W 120–111
| Abdul-Jabbar (36)
| Rambis (9)
| Johnson (17)
| The Forum17,505
| 3–2
|- align="center" bgcolor="#ccffcc"
| 6
| June 9, 198510:00a.m. PDT
| @ Boston
| W 111–100
| Abdul-Jabbar (29)
| Johnson, Rambis (101)
| Johnson (14)
| Boston Garden14,890
| 4–2
|-

Player statistics

Regular season

|-
| 
| 79 || style="background:#ffcd35;color:#6137ad;" |79 || 33.3 || style="background:#ffcd35;color:#6137ad;" |.599 || .000 || .732 || style="background:#ffcd35;color:#6137ad;" |7.9 || 3.2 || 0.8 || style="background:#ffcd35;color:#6137ad;" |2.1 || style="background:#ffcd35;color:#6137ad;" |22.0
|-
| 
| 77 || 77 || style="background:#ffcd35;color:#6137ad;" |36.1 || .561 || .189 || .843 || 6.2 || style="background:#ffcd35;color:#6137ad;" |12.6 || style="background:#ffcd35;color:#6137ad;" |1.5 || 0.3 || 18.3
|-
| 
| 80 || 76 || 33.7 || .572 || .000 || .776 || 6.4 || 2.5 || 1.1 || 0.8 || 17.6
|-
| 
| 81 || 65 || 28.5 || .539 || style="background:#ffcd35;color:#6137ad;" |.433 || .820 || 2.6 || 3.0 || 1.2 || 0.2 || 16.0
|-
| 
| 66 || 0 || 19.0 || .520 || .000 || .753 || 4.5 || 1.0 || 0.3 || 0.8 || 10.5
|-
| 
| 76 || 3 || 15.4 || .538 || .361 || .588 || 2.2 || 0.9 || 0.5 || 0.1 || 10.2
|-
| 
| style="background:#ffcd35;color:#6137ad;" |82 || 20 || 26.7 || .465 || .285 || style="background:#ffcd35;color:#6137ad;" |.865 || 3.1 || 5.2 || 1.1 || 0.6 || 8.6
|-
| 
| 42 || 8 || 18.1 || .488 || .000 || .773 || 2.2 || 1.0 || 0.5 || 0.1 || 8.3
|-
| 
| 75 || 32 || 17.2 || .548 || .000 || .767 || 3.0 || 1.8 || 0.6 || 0.2 || 6.7
|-
| 
| 58 || 3 || 12.3 || .504 ||       || .659 || 3.2 || 0.4 || 0.3 || 0.3 || 5.3
|-
| 
| style="background:#ffcd35;color:#6137ad;" |82 || 46 || 19.7 || .554 ||      || .660 || 6.4 || 0.8 || 1.0 || 0.6 || 5.2
|-
| 
| 32 || 1 || 8.7 || .415 || .000 || .677 || 0.8 || 2.5 || 0.5 || 0.1 || 2.8
|-
| 
| 11 || 0 || 5.4 || .294 ||      || .250 || 1.8 || 0.3 || 0.0 || 1.4 || 1.1
|-
| 
| 2 || 0 || 3.5 || .000 ||      ||      || 0.0 || 0.0 || 0.0 || 0.0 || 0.0
|}

Playoffs

Awards and records
 Kareem Abdul-Jabbar, NBA Finals Most Valuable Player Award
 Magic Johnson, All-NBA First Team
 Kareem Abdul-Jabbar, All-NBA Second Team
 Michael Cooper, NBA All-Defensive First Team

References

External links
 

NBA championship seasons
Los
Los Angeles Lakers seasons
Western Conference (NBA) championship seasons
Los Angle
Los Angle